Socialist Youth League Karl Liebknecht, was a communist youth organization in West Berlin during the Cold War. It was the youth organization of Socialist Unity Party of West Berlin. It was a member of World Federation of Democratic Youth.

Youth wings of communist parties
Socialist Unity Party of Germany
Historical youth wings of political parties in Germany
West Berlin